Emmanuel Anglican College is an  independent Anglicanism co-educational primary and secondary day school, located at  in the Northern Rivers region of New South Wales, Australia. Established in 1998, the College provides education for students from Year K to Year 12. The current principal is Robert Tobias.

History 
Emmanuel Anglican College was created as an Anglican College within the Anglican Diocese of Grafton. It is part of the network of Anglican Colleges within the Diocese including Lindisfarne Anglican Grammar School, Clarence Valley Anglican School, Bishop Druitt College, and St Columba Anglican School.

The College was established with 16 students in 1998, and since that time it has grown rapidly, with enrolments reaching 420 in 2007. Recently, Emmanuel Anglican College has grown further with the enrolment of approximately 100 - 200 students in 2015. In 2019 it now as around 712 students and over 70 staff.

College campus 
Building on the site commenced in 1999. In 2002, the College opened a new 'state-of-the-art' building with four classrooms and retracting walls, providing accommodation for a 350 student assembly. In 2004, a large 2-storey Science and Technology Centre was constructed. In 2009, a new library was constructed. An all-purpose court has been constructed that accommodates five sports, and a hockey field area forms part of the grounds. In 2017 there were plan to extend the school with another four buildings.

Current specialist facilities include Science, Food Technology, Art and Wood Technics, Drama and a Music Room. The Music Room opens out onto a purpose built staging area.

St Mary's Anglican Parish in Ballina provides the church for use on formal chapel occasions.

See also

 List of Anglican schools in New South Wales

References

External links 
 College website

Anglican primary schools in New South Wales
Anglican secondary schools in New South Wales
Educational institutions established in 1998
1998 establishments in Australia
Ballina, New South Wales